Splendrillia espyra is a species of sea snail, a marine gastropod mollusk in the family Drilliidae.

Description
The length of the shell varies between 5 mm and 8 mm.

Distribution
This marine species occurs off Eastern Brazil.

References

External links
 

espyra
Gastropods described in 1928